Robert Hull (fl. 1407) of Down Place, Surrey, was an English politician.

He married 'Elisora', who has been identified as possibly Elizabeth Stonhurst alias Doune of Doune (Down) Place.

He was a Member (MP) of the Parliament of England for Guildford in 1407.

References

14th-century births
15th-century deaths
English MPs 1407
People from Surrey (before 1889)
Members of Parliament for Guildford